"Ride the Night Away" is a song by Australian rock musician, Jimmy Barnes and released in February 1986 as the third and final single from Barnes' second studio album, For the Working Class Man. The song peaked at number 39 on the Australian Kent Music Report.

Music video
A music video was produced to promote the single.

Track listing
7" Single (K 9931)
Side A "Ride the Night Away" - 4:20
Side B "Paradise" (Remixed Version) - 3:04

Charts

References

Mushroom Records singles
1986 singles
1985 songs
Jimmy Barnes songs
Song recordings produced by Mark Opitz